Hatun Raqra (Quechua hatun big, raqra fissure, crack, crevice, "big crack (or crevice)", also spelled Jatun Racra) is a mountain in the Andes of Peru which reaches a height of approximately . It is located in the Junín Region, Tarma Province, Cajas District.

References 

Mountains of Peru
Mountains of Junín Region